Sonia Molanes Costa (born May 28, 1980 in Cangas de Morrazo) is a Spanish sprint canoer who has competed since the early 2000's. She won eight medals at the ICF Canoe Sprint World Championships with two golds (K-2 200 m: 2001, 2002), a silver (K-4 200 m: 2002), and five bronzes (K-2 500 m: 2001, 2002; K-2 1000 m: 2001, K-4 500 m: 2002, 2009).

At the 2008 Summer Olympics in Beijing, Molanes finished fifth in the K-4 500 m event while being eliminated in the semifinals of the K-2 500 m event.

References

 Canoe09.ca profile
 
 
 Sports-reference.com profile

1980 births
Canoeists at the 2008 Summer Olympics
Living people
Olympic canoeists of Spain
Spanish female canoeists
ICF Canoe Sprint World Championships medalists in kayak
21st-century Spanish women